Andrew Fleming (23 April 1916 – 27 March 2011) was an Irish hurler and Gaelic footballer. At club level he played for Mount Sion and Stradbally, winning a combined total of 11 championship medals in both codes, and was the last surviving member of the Waterford senior hurling team that won the 1948 All-Ireland Championship.

Playing as a dual player during the 1940s, Fleming won six Waterford Hurling Championship medals with Mount Sion as well as five consecutive Waterford Football Championship medals with Stradbally.

Fleming made his first appearance for the Waterford senior hurling team during the 1939 Munster Championship and enjoyed his greatest successes as a defender over the following decade. In 1948 he won his only All-Ireland Championship after a defeat of Dublin in the final, having earlier won a Munster Championship title. Fleming was later selected on the Waterford Hurling Teams of the Century and Millennium.

Honours

Mount Sion
Waterford Senior Hurling Championship (6): 1939, 1940, 1943, 1945, 1948, 1949
Waterford Junior Football Championship (1): 1939

Stardbally
Waterford Senior Football Championship (5): 1940, 1941, 1942, 1943, 1944

Waterford
All-Ireland Senior Hurling Championship (1): 1948 (c)
Munster Senior Hurling Championship (1): 1948 (c)

Munster
Railway Cup (7): 1943, 1944, 1945, 1946, 1949, 1950, 1951

References

1916 births
2011 deaths
CIÉ people
Dual players
Mount Sion hurlers
Waterford inter-county hurlers
Stradbally (Waterford) Gaelic footballers
Waterford inter-county Gaelic footballers
Munster inter-provincial hurlers
All-Ireland Senior Hurling Championship winners